Pat Brown may refer to:

 Pat Brown (1905–1996), American politician, Governor of the State of California
 Pat Brown (criminal profiler) (born 1955), American writer, criminal profiler and commentator
 Pat Crawford Brown (1929–2019), American television and film actress
 Pat "Sleepy" Brown (born 1970), American record producer with Society of Soul
 Pat Brown, lead singer of the American band Sing it Loud
 Pat Brown, fictional character in The Last Man on Earth (TV series)
 Pat Brown (cricketer) (born 1998), English cricketer

See also
Patricia Brown (disambiguation)
 Patrick Brown (disambiguation)
 Pat Browne (born 1963), American politician